The  Kansas City Chiefs season was the franchise's 19th season in the National Football League and the 29th overall.

Bill Kenney opened the team's initial two games at quarterback, but was replaced by Steve DeBerg for the second half against Seattle. DeBerg guided the team to a 20–13 win against Denver in his initial start as a member of the Chiefs. However, six losses, and a tie followed as Kenney and DeBerg jostled for the starting job.

As the season drew to a close, it became apparent the winds of change were blowing across the organization. President Jack Steadman resigned on December 8, while general manager Jim Schaaf was relieved of his duties the same day. Steadman was later named chairman of the board. On the field, the Chiefs finished the year at 4–11–1 as questions swirled regarding head coach Frank Gansz's future and who would fill the club's leadership void. One day after the season's conclusion, former Philadelphia Eagles and United States Football League executive Carl Peterson was named the club's president/general manager and chief operating officer on December 19.

Offseason 
The spring was marked by several notable trades as the club jockeyed to improve on its 4–11 finish in 1987. Todd Blackledge was traded to Pittsburgh on March 29 and 12-year veteran quarterback Steve DeBerg was acquired from Tampa Bay on March 31. The Chiefs moved up one spot in the first round of the draft to select defensive end Neil Smith with the second overall pick.

NFL draft

Personnel

Staff

Roster

Preseason

Regular season

Schedule 

Note: Intra-division opponents are in bold text.

Game summaries

Week 1 vs. Cleveland Browns

Week 2 at Seattle Seahawks

Week 3 vs. Denver Broncos

Week 4 vs. San Diego Chargers

Week 5 at New York Jets

Week 6 at Houston Oilers

Week 7 vs. Los Angeles Raiders

Week 8 vs. Detroit Lions

Week 9: at Los Angeles Raiders

Week 10: at Denver Broncos

Week 11: vs. Cincinnati Bengals

Week 12: vs. Seattle Seahawks

Week 13: at Pittsburgh Steelers

Week 14: vs. New York Jets

Week 15: at New York Giants

Week 16: at San Diego Chargers

Standings

References

External links 
 1988 Kansas City Chiefs at Pro-Football-Reference.com

Kansas City Chiefs
Kansas City Chiefs seasons
Kansas